Pallene  is a very small natural satellite of Saturn. It is one of three small moons known as the Alkyonides that lie between the orbits of the larger Mimas and Enceladus. It is also designated .

Discovery 

Pallene was discovered by the Cassini Imaging Team in 2004, during the Cassini–Huygens mission. It was given the temporary designation . In 2005, the name Pallene was provisionally approved by the IAU Division III Working Group for Planetary System Nomenclature, and was ratified at the IAU General Assembly in 2006. The name refers to Pallene, one of the Alkyonides, the seven beautiful daughters of the giant Alkyoneus.

After the discovery in 2004, it was realized that Pallene had been first photographed on August 23, 1981, by the space probe . It had appeared in a single photograph and had been provisionally named  and estimated to orbit 200,000 km from Saturn. Because it had not been visible in other images, it had not been possible to compute its orbit at the time, but recent comparisons have shown it to match Pallene's orbit.

Orbital characteristics 

Pallene is visibly affected by a perturbing mean-longitude resonance with the much larger Enceladus, although this effect is not as large as Mimas's perturbations on Methone. The perturbations cause Pallene's osculating orbital elements to vary with an amplitude of about 4 km in semi-major axis, and 0.02° in longitude (corresponding to about 75 km). Eccentricity also changes on various timescales between 0.002 and 0.006, and inclination between about 0.178° and 0.184°.

Ring 

In 2006, images taken in forward-scattered light by the Cassini spacecraft enabled the Cassini Imaging Team to discover a faint dust ring around Saturn that shares Pallene's orbit, now named the Pallene Ring. The ring has a radial extent of about 2,500 km. Its source is particles blasted off Pallene's surface by meteoroid impacts, which then form a diffuse ring around its orbital path.

Exploration 

The Cassini spacecraft, which studied Saturn and its moons until September, 2017, performed a fly-by of Pallene on 16 October 2010, and 14 September 2011 at a distance of 36,000 kilometers (22,000 miles) and 44,000 kilometers respectively.

References

Further reading

External links 

Pallene Profile by NASA's Solar System Exploration

Moons of Saturn
20040601
Moons with a prograde orbit